John Molson Junior (October 14, 1787 – July 12, 1860) was a Canadian politician and entrepreneur. He served as director of Molson Bank, president of the Champlain and St. Lawrence Railroad (Canada's first railway), and president of Montreal General Hospital. He was the son of the founder of the Molson family dynasty in Canadian business.

Life
Born October 14, 1787, son of John Molson (1763-1836) & Sarah Vaughn (1751-1829), at Montreal, Quebec. Though he was apprenticed to the brewing trade and became a partner in the family brewery in 1816, Molson was primarily a financier. The family monopoly of river transport enabled him, as owner of the Swiftsure, to engage in profitable banking operations during the War of 1812, buying bills of exchange at heavy discount in Montreal and disposing of them at a profit in Quebec. He became a director of the Bank of Montreal shortly after its foundation and was vice-president of Molson's Bank from its incorporation in 1855. He was a promoter of the Champlain and St. Lawrence Railroad, Canada's first railway, and became its president in 1837. His other interests included the first Montreal water works and gas company, fire insurance and various industrial enterprises. He succeeded his father as a life governor, vice-president and president of the Montreal General Hospital. As chairman of the Constitutional Association he fought on the government side in the Rebellions of 1837 and was wounded; he was given the rank of Lieutenant-Colonel of the militia. In 1838-41 he was a member of the Special Council of Lower Canada.

Marriage and children
In 1816 he was wed to his first cousin, Mary Anne Molson (1791-1862), daughter of Thomas Molson (1768-1803) of Lincolnshire, England and Anne Atkinson (1765-1813). John and Mary Ann had one daughter and five sons. One of their sons, John Molson III, also married his cousin, the daughter of his father's brother William Molson, and become a president of the Molson Bank.

John died on July 12, 1860 at Montreal.

References

External links

1787 births
1860 deaths
Anglophone Quebec people
Canadian people of English descent
John Molson Jr.
Businesspeople from Montreal
Politicians from Montreal
Pre-Confederation Quebec people
19th-century American businesspeople